Comprehensive Therapy was a quarterly peer-reviewed medical journal covering clinical diagnosis, pharmacology, treatment, and disease management. It was established in 1975 and published by Humana Press until 2008, when the American Society of Contemporary Medicine and Surgery, of which it had been an official journal, took over. The journal was discontinued in 2010. It was abstracted and indexed in Index Medicus/MEDLINE/PubMed, CINAHL, and Scopus.

References

External links 

General medical journals
Quarterly journals
Publications established in 1975
Publications disestablished in 2010
Springer Science+Business Media academic journals
Academic journals published by learned and professional societies
English-language journals